William Murray Black (December 8, 1855 – September 24, 1933) was a career officer in the United States Army, noted for his ability to organize and train young engineers.

Biography

Black, born in Lancaster, Pennsylvania, graduated first in the United States Military Academy class of 1877 and was commissioned in the Corps of Engineers. From 1886 to 1891 Black headed the Jacksonville District, and in 1897-98 he was the Engineer Commissioner on the governing board of the District of Columbia. In the Spanish–American War, he was Chief Engineer, 3d and 5th Army Corps. As Chief Engineer under Generals William Ludlow and Leonard Wood (1899–1901), and six years later as advisor to the Cuban Department of Public Works, he modernized Havana's sanitary system. As commandant of the Army Engineer School (1901–03), Black moved it from the Fort at Willets Point, New York to Washington Barracks, D.C. After his return from Cuba in 1909, he was Northeast Division Engineer and chairman of a board to raise the battleship . Devoted to training young engineer officers in the art of war, General Black's greatest responsibility came as Chief of Engineers during World War I in mobilizing and training some 300,000 engineer troops for a wide range of military engineering tasks. For this work he was awarded the Army Distinguished Service Medal, the citation for which reads:

He retired October 31, 1919, and died in Washington, D.C., on September 24, 1933.  He is buried at West Point Cemetery.

Legacy
The , launched July 1943, was named in his honor as was the dustpan dredge William M. Black.

References

Bibliography

External links
This article contains public domain text from

United States Army Corps of Engineers Chiefs of Engineers
1855 births
1933 deaths
Recipients of the Distinguished Service Medal (US Army)
United States Army generals of World War I
United States Army generals
United States Military Academy alumni
Members of the Board of Commissioners for the District of Columbia
Burials at West Point Cemetery
People from Lancaster, Pennsylvania
19th-century American engineers
20th-century American engineers
Engineers from Pennsylvania
Military personnel from Pennsylvania